Runde Rural District Council is Zvishavane Rural District local government arm taking care of the rural district while Zvishavane Town Council administers the urban district.

Zvishavane District has two local government arms, Zvishavane Town Council created under the Zimbabwe Urban Councils Act, Chapter 29.15 and Runde RDC created in terms of the Zimbabwe Rural District Councils Act, Chapter 29.13.

Background

Runde RDC is one of the 8 rural district councils in the Midlands Province of Zimbabwe. 
 
Its name derives from Runde River.

It comprises Zvishavane-Ngezi and Zvishavane-Runde.

 Zvishavane-Ngezi has wards 3 5 6 11 12 and 19.
 Zvishavane-Runde has wards 1 2 4 7 8 9 10 13 14 15 16 17 and 18.

2013 - 2018 Councillors

All councillors in this term are from ZANU-PF.

Source: Zimbabwe Electoral Commission 

Zimbabwe Rural District Councils Act; Chapter 29.13.

Zimbabwe Urban Councils Act, Chapter 29.15

2008 - 2013 Coincillors

All councillors in this term were from ZANU-PF

Source: Kubatana Aechive

See also

 Zvishavane District

References 

Districts of Midlands Province